Solar Crisis is a 1990 Japanese-American co-production science fiction thriller film directed by Richard C. Sarafian (credited as Alan Smithee). The screenplay was written by Joe Gannon and Tedi Sarafian (credited as Crispan Bolt), based on the 1990 novel Crisis 2050 by Takeshi Kawata, who co-produced the film. The film was first released in Japan in 1990, and in the United States in 1992.

The cast features Tim Matheson as Steve Kelso, Charlton Heston as Adm. "Skeet" Kelso, Peter Boyle as Arnold Teague, Annabel Schofield as Alex Noffe, Corin Nemec as Mike Kelso and Jack Palance as Travis. The executive producers were Takeshi Kawata and Takehito Sadamura. FX cinematographer Richard Edlund and veteran sound editor James Nelson were its producers.

Plot
To stop a solar flare from destroying the Earth, Steve Kelso is tasked to drop an artificially intelligent bomb on the Sun from the spaceship Helios. Arnold Teague, who believes the danger to be overstated, attempts to sabotage the mission so he can profit from the panic. Teague's agents on Earth clash with Kelso's father, Admiral "Skeet" Kelso, and his son, Mike.

Cast

Production 
Solar Crisis began shooting in November 1989 with an announced budget of $30 million.  Nippon Steel, one of the investors, announced a Japanese theme park based on the film.

Scientist Richard J. Terrile served as a technical advisor. He at first tried to convince the filmmakers to avoid sending a crew to the Sun, calling it unscientific.  When it was explained to him that audience would demand such a plot point regardless of scientific accuracy, Terrile said he realized his job was to make impossible situations sound more plausible.

Release
TV Guide quoted the final budget as $43 million. The film opened in Japan in 1990, where it underperformed. In response, the producers extensively recut and reshot scenes to secure an American distributor. Sarafian had his name removed from the credits and replaced with the Directors Guild of America alias "Alan Smithee".  Sarafian's son, Tedi, who performed rewrites, was credited as "Crispan Bolt". Producers Edlund and Nelson also brought in Rene Balcer to do uncredited rewrites.

Reception 
TV Guide rated it 2/5 stars and wrote, "Enjoy its awesome visuals or scorn its slipshod execution, Solar Crisis amounts to one small step for cinema, one giant leap for Alan Smithee."

See also
Sunshine, a film with a similar premise of dropping a bomb into the Sun to save the Earth.
Solar Attack, a direct-to-video film by Lions Gate Entertainment with a somewhat similar plot
 Sun in culture

References

External links
 
 

1990 films
1990s science fiction thriller films
American science fiction thriller films
Japanese science fiction thriller films
English-language Japanese films
American space adventure films
Films based on science fiction novels
Apocalyptic films
Films based on Japanese novels
Sun in film
Films about artificial intelligence
Films about astronauts
Trimark Pictures films
Films scored by Maurice Jarre
Films directed by Richard C. Sarafian
1990s English-language films
1990s American films
1990s Japanese films